Koohi Goth Women Hospital is a hospital located in Bin Qasim Town, Karachi, Pakistan. It is a project of the Zafar and Atia Foundation Charitable Trust. This hospital treats 1 out of 6 cases reported in Pakistan.

This is the only charity fistula treatment center in South Asia.

History
It started its services in 2006 by treating women suffering from complications like obstetric fistula and other gynecological disorders. It provides laparoscopic surgery and fistula management training.

The hospital runs under the supervision of Sher Shah Syed. He runs PNFWH and Koohi Goth Hospital in Landhi.

Schools
It also has a chain of training institutions.
 Atia School of Paramedics
 Atia School of Midwifery
 Atia School of Nursing

References

2006 establishments in Pakistan
Hospitals established in 2006
Hospitals in Karachi